The Belgian Mathematical Society (abbreviated as BMS), founded in 1921 by Théophile de Donder at the Université libre de Bruxelles, is the national mathematical society of Belgium and a member society of the European Mathematical Society. Its mission is to assemble all Belgian mathematicians and defend their interests. Foreign members are also welcome. 

The society publishes the journal Bulletin of the Belgian Mathematical Society - Simon Stevin and distributes a newsletter to members, both at a rate of five issues per year.

Presidents 

14/3/1921-14/01/1922	Théophile De Donder (1872-1957)	ULBruxelles	
1923-1925	 (1852-1928)	ULBruxelles	
1925-1927	Alphonse Demoulin (1869-1947)	U Gent	
1927-1929	 (1866-1962)	K.U.Leuven
1929-1931	Adolphe Mineur (1867-1950)	ULBruxelles	
1931-1933	Lucien Godeaux (1887-1975)	ULBruxelles	
1933-1935	Alfred Errera (1886-1960)	ULBruxelles	
1935-1937	Émile Merlin (1875-1930)	U Gent	
1937-1939	Fernand Simonart (1888-1966)	K.U.Leuven
1939-1945	Bony	U. Mons-Hainaut	
1945-1947	Henri Germay (1894-1954)	U Liège
1947-1949	Georges Lemaître (1894-1966)	K.U.Leuven
1949-1951	Théophile Lepage (1901-1991)	ULBruxelles	
1951-1953	Fernand Backes (1897-1985)	U Gent	
1953-1955	Octave Rozet	U Liège	
1955-1957	Louis Bouckaert (1909-1988)	K.U.Leuven
1957-1959	Paul Libois (1901-1991)	ULBruxelles		
1959-1961	Julien Bilo (1914-2006)	U Gent		
1961-1963	Henri Garnir (1921-1985)	U Liège	
1964-1965	Robert Ballieu (1914-1980)	UCLouvain
1966-1967	Eduard Franckx (1907- )	KMS - ERM	
1968-1969	Pol Burniat (1902-1975)	ULBruxelles	
1970-1971	Carl Clement Grosjean (1926-2006)	U Gent	
1972-1973	René Lavendhomme (1928-2002)	UCLouvain	
1974-1975	Henri Breny (1923-1991)	U Liège		
1976-1977	Alfred Warrinier (1938)	K.U.Leuven		
1978-1979	Robert Debever (1915-1998)	ULBruxelles		
1980-1981	Franz Bingen (1932)	VUBrussel	
1982-1983	José Paris	UCLouvain	
10/1983-10/1986	Richard Delanghe (1940)	U Gent	
10/1986-10/1988	Paul van Praag (1938)	U Mons-Hainaut		
10/1988-1992	Alain Verschoren (1954)	U Antwerpen	
1993-10/1996	Luc Lemaire (1950)	ULBruxelles	
10/1996-10/1999	Freddy Dumortier (1947)	U Hasselt	
10/1999-10/2002	Jean Schmets (1940)	U Liège	
10/2002-10/2005	Adhemar Bultheel (1948)	K.U.Leuven	
10/2005-10/2008	Cathérine Finet	U Mons-Hainaut	
10/2008-10/2011	Stefaan Caenepeel (1956)	VUBrussel	
10/2011-9/2015	Françoise Bastin U. Liège	
10/2015-9/2018	Philippe Cara 	VU Brussel	
10/2018-9/2021	Yves-Caoimhin (Yvik) Swan 	Uni. of Liège

References

External links
Official website

Mathematical societies
Learned societies of Belgium
Organizations established in 1921